Muscicapoidea is a superfamily belonging to the infraorder Passerides containing the Old World flycatchers, thrushes, starlings and their allies. The superfamily contains around 670 species.

Within the parvorder Muscicapida, Muscicapoidea is sister to a clade containing the superfamily Certhioidea and the family Regulidae.

Classification 
In 2019 Carl Oliveros and colleagues published a large molecular phylogenetic study of the passerines that included species from each of the seven families that make up the superfamily Muscicapoidea.

References 

 
Bird superfamilies
Passerida
Extant Oligocene first appearances